Liplje is a small settlement north of Planina in the Municipality of Postojna in the Inner Carniola region of Slovenia.

Geography
Liplje is a scattered village below the east slope of Mount Planina (Planinska gora) and on the western edge of the Planina Karst Field (Planinsko polje) along the main road from Logatec to Planina. It includes the hamlet of Podgora north-northwest of the village core. There are some hayfields and tilled land in the karst field itself that are subject to occasional flooding. There are several springs below the road and above the karst field.

Name
The name Liplje is derived from a plural demonym, *Lipľane 'residents of Lipa', itself derived from the common noun lipa 'linden', referring to the local vegetation. Places named after the linden tree are common in Slovenia, with other examples including Lipa, Lipe, Lipje, Lipica, and Lipce.

References

External links

Liplje on Geopedia

Populated places in the Municipality of Postojna